is a Japanese singer and comedian raised in Saga City. He plays the bass guitar. He rose to fame in Japan for a comical song about Saga Prefecture and its oddities.

TV commercials
 Yukiguni Maitake bean sprouts

Films
Digimon Savers: Ultimate Power! Burst Mode Activated!! (Argomon)

References

External links
 Hanawa on Teichiku Entertainment website 
 Yukiguni Maitake website 

1976 births
Japanese impressionists (entertainers)
Japanese comedy musicians
Living people
People from Saga (city)
Musicians from Saga Prefecture
Musicians from Saitama Prefecture